The Philippines men's national basketball team, led by head coach Chot Reyes continues their campaign to advance from the first round of the 2019 FIBA Basketball World Cup Asian qualifiers. The national team is set to face Australia in Melbourne and Bocaue, Japan in Pasay, and Chinese Taipei in an away game. After the first round of the World Cup qualifiers, Yeng Guiao took over as head coach of the national team.

The first training of the national team for 2018 commenced on January 8, as they prepare for the second window of the first round of the World Cup Asian qualifiers.

Record

Uniforms

Tournaments

2019 FIBA Basketball World Cup qualification

First round
Phase: First round

1 A bench-clearing brawl broke out with 4:02 remaining in the third quarter, resulting in 13 players (nine from the Philippines and four from Australia) being ejected. The game was halted with 1:57 remaining in the third quarter when two of the remaining Philippines players fouled out, and awarded to Australia as a default.
Potential penalties from FIBA are pending.

Second round
Phase: Second round

Asian Games

Exhibition games

2 The match was abandoned in the fourth quarter with 6:26 minutes remaining following arguments between Philippines coach Yeng Guiao and Jordan coach Joseph Steibing following a Jordanian player throwing a ball at Filipino player Scottie Thompson during a dead ball situation. Tensions began as early as the second quarter when Christian Standhardinger was hard fouled by a Jordanian player. Steibing called off the game.

Rosters

2019 FIBA Basketball World Cup qualification (Asia) – First Round
February
Versus Australia
A 14-man roster was revealed by head coach, Chot Reyes on February 18, 2018 for the Australia game to be held February 22 in Melbourne. A final lineup of 12 players is set to be announced. On February 21, Jayson Castro and Jio Jalalon were excluded from the final 12-man roster due to injury concerns.

Versus Japan
Kevin Alas, Carl Brian Cruz and Abu Tratter, who played in the Australia game were replaced for the national team's match against Japan. The three were replaced by Jayson Castro, Jio Jalalon, and Troy Rosario, who were previously not fielded due to injuries.

Notes

See also
2017 Philippines national basketball team results

References

Philippines men's national basketball team results
2017–18 in Philippine basketball
2018–19 in Philippine basketball